Anna Katharina Schwabroh (October 21, 1979 in Hamburg) is a German actress.

Life
Anna Katharina Schwabroh was born in 1979 in Hamburg. Her love for the theater began with visits to the Thalia Theater Hamburg. When she was 11 years old, she saw Robert Wilson's The Black Rider and later Time Rocker and Alice. These productions impressed Schwabroh deeply and she wanted to know theater. She won insights behind the stage, she completed internships by the Thalia Theater. She felt the urge to act on stage. Her first stage experience she gained before studying acting as lead singer of the band from Hamburg Alto.

From 2002 to 2006, she completed her acting studies at the University of the Arts Bern. She received her diploma. Engagements have taken her to the Schauspielhaus Zurich to the Lucerne Theater and the Theater Fabrik Hamburg.

She appeared in television productions, including the crime scene and Hamburg Dockland. In the Swiss film Cargo Schwabroh played the main role. In summer 2009, she played Clara in the operetta The White Horse Inn on the floating stage Kreuzlingen. In the summer of 2010, she performed at the Berliner Ensemble in the musical The Island Comedy.

Since 2010, she has been a permanent member of the Landestheater Detmold. In the 2011/2012 season she performed as Mae in Cat on a Hot Tin Roof and as Recha in Nathan the Wise. She also played Pauline Piperkarcka in Gerhart Hauptmann's The rats and the title role in the musical Irma la Douce.

Theater

Filmography

cinema
 2005: Helga, short film, directed by Fabian Niklaus 
 2005: Aporue was aroused, short film, directed by Fabian Niklaus 
 2006: Bridges, short film, directed by Fabian Niklaus 
 2009: Cargo, directed by Ivan Engler and Ralph Etter

Television
 2004: Oeschenen, Swiss TV film, directed by Bernhard Giger
 2008: Notruf Hafenkante: Herzenssache, directed by Ulli Baumann
 2009: Tatort: Tote Männer, directed by Thomas Jauch

References

External links
  
 Official website of the actress Anna Katharina Schwabroh

1979 births
Living people
German film actresses
German stage actresses
German television actresses
21st-century German actresses
Actresses from Hamburg